Saifeddine Alami Bazza (born 19 November 1992) is a Moroccan professional footballer who plays as a midfielder.

Professional career
Alami was born in Morocco, but moved to Spain at the age of 7. He was part of the Nike Academy in 2012. He spent his early career in the lower divisions of Spain, Germany, and Romania before moving to Paris FC in France.

Alami made his professional debut for Paris FC in a 2–1 Ligue 2 win over Football Bourg-en-Bresse Péronnas 01, scoring on his debut and assisting the winner.

Honours

Raja Casablanca
CAF Confederation Cup: 2018
CAF Super Cup: 2019

References

External links
 
 
 L'Equipe Profile
 Paris FC Profile

1994 births
Living people
People from Béni Mellal-Khénifra
Moroccan footballers
Spanish footballers
Moroccan emigrants to Spain
Naturalised citizens of Spain
Spanish sportspeople of Moroccan descent
Lleida Esportiu footballers
SV Waldhof Mannheim players
FC Dunărea Călărași players
Paris FC players
Raja CA players
FC Rapid București players
Segunda División B players
Regionalliga players
Liga II players
Championnat National players
Ligue 2 players
Association football midfielders
Moroccan expatriate footballers
Moroccan expatriate sportspeople in Romania
Moroccan expatriate sportspeople in Germany
Moroccan expatriate sportspeople in France
Expatriate footballers in Romania
Expatriate footballers in Germany
Expatriate footballers in France
Nike Academy players
UE Tàrrega players